Collins Engineers, Inc. is an ENR Top 500 Design Firm and provides civil, structural, water resources, waterfront, program management and underwater engineering services to government agencies, contractors, and private sector clients. The firm was founded by Thomas J. Collins in April 1979. It is a privately held company with eighteen offices in the United States, United Kingdom, and Ireland. Collins Engineers, Inc. is headquartered in Chicago, Illinois.

Collins Engineers, Inc. was an early advocate for the use of professional engineers as diving inspectors in the evaluation of underwater structures. Using this service, the firm provides underwater engineering services performed by in-house engineer-divers around the world to clients including the United States Navy and state departments of transportation. Collins Engineers, Inc. has also developed reference manuals on the subject for the Federal Highway Administration (FHWA) and National Highway Institute (NHI).

Collins Engineers, Inc. also provides design and analysis services for railroads, waterfront facilities, and transportation structures, as well as site development engineering for commercial and institutional concerns.

In 2006, Collins Engineers, Inc. acquired MacIntosh Engineering and Development Co. (Auburn, California). In 2008, Collins Engineers, Inc. acquired Charles Keim & Associates, Inc. (Boulder, Colorado).

Services 
Services offered by Collins Engineers, Inc. include bridge design and inspection; building design and inspection; civil and site engineering; construction engineering; construction inspection and management; dam, tunnel, and power facility assessment; railroad engineering; earth retention structure design; scour assessment and remediation design; energy structures; roadway engineering; seismic engineering; structural engineering; ancillary highway structure inspection and design; underwater engineering; infrastructure management, program management, asset management and database development for transportation facilities; waterfront facility design and inspection; course development and instruction; and emergency response.

Projects

Bridge Engineering 
 Design Services for The Bloomingdale Trail/The 606, Chicago, Illinois
 Climbing and Rope Access Inspections of Structures for Network Rail, London, England
 SC 802 over the Beaufort River (Intracoastal Waterway), Beaufort, South Carolina
 Park Island Bridge Design and Management, Mt. Pleasant, South Carolina
 Reconstruction of Metra Bridge No. Z-70.5 over Lake Street, Hanover Park, Illinois
 Milwaukee River Parkway Bridges (North and South), Milwaukee, Wisconsin
 SC 49 Bridge over the Enoree River, Laurens County, South Carolina
 Virginia Avenue Bridge, Charleston, South Carolina
 Emergency Underwater Inspection Following Impact at Eggner Ferry Bridge, Trigg and Marshall Counties, Kentucky
 Bridge Management Database & 3-D Scanning for Waterways Ireland
 Emergency Response to Early Spring Flooding—Grand Forks, North Dakota, and East Grand Forks, Minnesota
 Rope Access and Climbing Inspections, Statewide, Montana
 Post-Flood Scour Inspections, Statewide, Rhode Island
 Post-Hurricane Irene Scour Inspections, New Jersey and Massachusetts

Construction 
 Wells Street Bascule Bridge Reconstruction, Chicago, Illinois
 Rehabilitation of Juneau and Wisconsin Avenue Lift Bridges, Milwaukee, Wisconsin
 EJ&E Bridge Roll-In Design, Morris, Illinois
 Wacker Drive Rehabilitation Construction Engineering, Chicago, Illinois
 Millennium Park Construction Engineering, Chicago, Illinois
 I-94 Dan Ryan Expressway Reconstruction Construction Engineering, Chicago, Illinois
 Interstate 94 (I-94) North-South Freeway Project Construction Inspection, Southeast Wisconsin
 Marquette Interchange Construction Inspection, Milwaukee, Wisconsin
 Mitchell Interchange Construction Inspection, Milwaukee, Wisconsin
 I-94 Construction Inspection, Stearns Road to Wisconsin State Line, Gurnee, Illinois

Dams 
 Reconstruction of Sinnissippi Dam, Rock Falls, Illinois
 Mohawk River Dam Safety Inspection, Rotterdam Junction, New York

Manual and Course Development 
 Underwater Bridge Inspection (FHWA-NHI-10-027), Federal Highway Administration/National Highway Institute
 Underwater Bridge Repair, Rehabilitation, and Countermeasures (FHWA-NHI-10-029), reference manual and course, Federal Highway Administration/National Highway Institute
 Pontis Development & Implementation for Louisiana Department of Transportation and Development
 Bridge Inspection and Reporting Guidelines, U.S. Navy Bridge Inspection Program
 Guidelines for the Installation, Inspection, Maintenance and Repair of Structural Supports for Highway Signs, Luminaires, and Traffic Signals (FHWA NHI 05-036), Federal Highway Administration/National Highway Institute
 Underwater Investigations Standard Practice Manual, American Society of Civil Engineers
 Underwater Evaluation and Repair of Bridge Components (FHWA-DP-98-1), Federal Highway Administration
 Underwater Bridge Inspection (FHWA-DP-80-1), Federal Highway Administration
 Chicago Department of Transportation Rules and Regulations for Construction in the Public Way, 2014 and 2016

Program Management Oversight/Infrastructure Management
 Chicago Department of Transportation Project Coordination Office (2012 - current), Chicago, Illinois
 Chicago Department of Transportation, dotMaps (2012 - current), Chicago, Illinois

Seismic Engineering 
 Charleston County School District Seismic Assessment, Charleston, South Carolina
 Union Pier Cruise Terminal, Charleston, South Carolina
 Parkside Avenue/Ocean Avenue Bridge Assessment, New York, New York
 Fort Vancouver National Historic Site Building Evaluation, Vancouver, Washington

Structural Engineering 
 CITGO Lemont Refinery Coker Turnaround, Lemont, Illinois
 Pulaski Road's Single Point Urban Diamond Interchange over Interstate 55, Chicago, Illinois

Waterfront Facilities 
 Union Pier Terminal Design, Charleston, South Carolina
 U.S. Coast Guard Facility Indian River Underwater Acoustic Imaging and Shoreline Stabilization, Rehoboth, Delaware
 Chicago Riverwalk, Chicago, Illinois
 Rehabilitation of the Fuel Pier at the Ronald Reagan Ballistic Missile Defense Test Site Kwajalein Atoll, Republic of the Marshall Islands
 Vietnam Veterans' Memorial at Wabash Plaza, Chicago, Illinois
 Repairs to Waterfront Facilities at the U.S. Naval Academy
 Structural Inspection of the Frying Pan Shoals and Diamond Shoals Light Towers for the U.S. Coast Guard, Cape Fear and Cape Hatteras, North Carolina

References

External links 

 

Construction and civil engineering companies of the United States
Companies based in Chicago